Anatoly Filippov (born 20 January 1963) is a Russian former boxer. He competed in the men's flyweight event at the 1992 Summer Olympics.

References

External links
 

1963 births
Living people
People from Ust-Maysky District
Russian male boxers
Olympic boxers of the Unified Team
Boxers at the 1992 Summer Olympics
Flyweight boxers
Sportspeople from Sakha